Cape Verde made its Paralympic Games début by sending a delegation to compete at the 2004 Summer Paralympics in Athens, Greece. The delegation consisted in two track and field athletes who took part in shot put and discus events, and a single competitor in powerlifting. None of them won a medal.

Athletics

Men's field

Women's field

Powerlifting

See also
Cape Verde at the Paralympics
Cape Verde at the 2004 Summer Olympics

References

External links
International Paralympic Committee

Nations at the 2004 Summer Paralympics
2004
Summer Paralympics